The Egon Schiele Art Centrum (ESAC) is a museum and gallery devoted to the Austrian painter Egon Schiele in Český Krumlov, Czech Republic.

History
The Egon Schiele Art Centrum was established in 1992 by a group of Czechs, Austrians and Americans. Since 1993 it has presented a permanent exhibition of the works of Egon Schiele in addition to annual displays of 20th-century art by artists such as Picasso, Dalí, and Klimt.

Art museums and galleries in the Czech Republic
Art museums established in 1992
1992 establishments in Czechoslovakia
Museums in the South Bohemian Region
Biographical museums in the Czech Republic
Buildings and structures in Český Krumlov
Český Krumlov
20th-century architecture in the Czech Republic